WOWK-TV (channel 13) is a television station licensed to Huntington, West Virginia, United States, serving the Charleston–Huntington market as an affiliate of CBS. Owned by Nexstar Media Group, the station maintains studios on Quarrier Street near the Charleston Town Center in downtown Charleston, and its transmitter is located in Milton, West Virginia.

History
The station went on-air October 2, 1955, as WHTN-TV (for Huntington), an ABC affiliate owned by the Greater Huntington Theater Corporation. After only a year, the station was bought by Cowles Communications (unrelated to the Spokane, Washington–based Cowles Publishing Company). WHTN swapped affiliations with WCHS-TV and became a CBS station for the first time in 1958. In 1960, Cowles sold Channel 13 to Reeves Telecom. It went back to ABC in 1962 and stayed with that network for 24 years. Reeves Telecom sold the station to Gateway Communications (a company formed by employees of the former broadcasting division of Triangle Publications) in 1974, becoming the company's only ABC affiliate, and the only station owned by Gateway that was not owned by Triangle prior to its acquisition. The following March, it changed its call letters to the current WOWK-TV to reflect the three states it serves (Ohio, West Virginia, and Kentucky). On June 1, 1986, it changed affiliations again, returning to CBS. The swap brought channel 13 in-line with sister stations WLYH in Lancaster, Pennsylvania, WTAJ-TV in Altoona, Pennsylvania, and WBNG-TV in Binghamton, New York, which had recently renewed their CBS relationships.

The station was headquartered at the Radio Center Building in Huntington from its inception until 1984 when WOWK moved to a location on Fifth Avenue. Gateway merged with SJL Broadcasting in 2000. SJL sold it to West Virginia Media Holdings in 2002. After the sale to West Virginia Media, it sold its Huntington building to regional radio conglomerate Kindred Communications and moved its studio and offices to Charleston. WOWK retained a news bureau and advertising sales office for the southern portion for the market in what is now the Kindred Capital Building, and its transmitter is still located at the Milton location.

On November 17, 2015, Nexstar Broadcasting Group announced that it would purchase the West Virginia Media Holdings stations, including WOWK-TV, for $130 million. Under the terms of the deal, Nexstar assumed control of the stations through a time brokerage agreement in December 2015, with the sale of the license assets completed on January 31, 2017. Nexstar CEO Perry A. Sook was a former employee of WOWK. This made WOWK-TV reunite with former Gateway-owned sister stations WTAJ and WBNG.

On June 15, 2016, Nexstar announced that it has entered into an affiliation agreement with Katz Broadcasting for the Escape, Laff, Grit, and Bounce TV networks (the last one of which is owned by Bounce Media LLC, whose COO Jonathan Katz is president/CEO of Katz Broadcasting), bringing one or more of the four networks to 81 stations owned and/or operated by Nexstar, including WOWK-TV. (Grit was available in Charleston on WCHS-DT3 until February 28, 2017 when it was replaced by TBD. It moved to WOWK in October 2017.)

News operation
WOWK-TV airs the market's only 7 p.m. newscast. The station also airs a 5 p.m. newscast. It provided weather forecasts for WVNS-TV in Beckley–Bluefield until late 2016.

On May 16, 2011, WOWK expanded its morning newscast to a 4:30 a.m. start time. It was the first station in the market, as well as in the state, to do so. The morning news expansion is a growing trend across the United States.

WOWK launched a 4 p.m newscast titled Good Day at 4 on September 5, 2022. This is the second 4pm newscast in the market.

WOWK produces a statewide evening newscast, Tonight Live at 5:30 pm (formerly West Virginia Tonight Live and West Virginia Tonight), which is simulcast across all of the former West Virginia Media Holdings stations. Tonight Live is aired at 11:30 p.m. on WDVM-TV in Hagerstown, Maryland (in the Washington, D.C. market). 

Historically, WOWK's newscasts have ranked third in the market, behind WSAZ and WCHS-TV. Generally, WOWK and WCHS-TV are stronger in the eastern half of the market, including Charleston. However, neither station does well in the western portion, including Huntington and the Ohio and Kentucky sides of the market.

Controversies
A former WOWK-TV reporter filed a lawsuit in December 2018 accusing the station of racial and sexual discrimination, harassment and retaliation. Aaliyah Brown filed her complaint in Cabell Circuit Court against Nexstar Broadcasting Inc., which operates WOWK.

In September 2021, main evening anchor Jennifer Abney chose not to renew her contract. WOWK General Manager Sean Banks sent out a station-wide email announcing the new evening anchor before he ever (and didn't) announce Abney was leaving.

Technical information

Subchannels
The station's digital signal is multiplexed:

Analog-to-digital conversion
WOWK-TV discontinued regular programming on its analog signal, over VHF channel 13, in early 2009. The station's digital signal relocated from its pre-transition UHF channel 47 to VHF channel 13. On January 25, 2009, an ice storm damaged the primary analog VHF channel 13  transmitter. Rather than repair it for two more months of service, the station shut down its analog transmission early and brought its digital channel 13 transmitter on-line.

References

External links

CBS network affiliates
Ion Mystery affiliates
Laff (TV network) affiliates
Grit (TV network) affiliates
OWK-TV
Television channels and stations established in 1955
Nexstar Media Group
1955 establishments in West Virginia